Edward Joseph "Eddie" Micallef (born 1 August 1941) is a former Australian politician.

He was born in Brunswick in Melbourne to Francis Emmanuel Micallef, a tradesman's assistant, and Rita Margaret, née Dali, who worked as a clothing machinist. He attended Catholic schools before studying at the Royal Melbourne Institute of Technology, becoming an apprentice fitter and turner in 1958. He completed his apprenticeship in 1963, becoming a turbine fitter in 1965. In 1968 he joined the Labor Party, and he became vice-president of the Reservoir branch from 1973 to 1974. In 1983 he was elected to the Victorian Legislative Assembly as the member for Springvale in a by-election. He was promoted to the front bench in 1992, serving as Shadow Minister for Industry Services and also assisting the Shadow Minister for Industrial Relations. Ethnic Affairs was added to his portfolio in 1994, but he stepped down from the front bench in 1997. Micallef lost preselection prior to the 1999 state election and retired from politics.

References

1941 births
Living people
Australian Labor Party members of the Parliament of Victoria
Members of the Victorian Legislative Assembly
People from Brunswick, Victoria
Politicians from Melbourne